Gavaevodata is the Avestan language name of the primordial bovine of Zoroastrian cosmogony and cosmology, one of Ahura Mazda's six primordial material creations and  the mythological progenitor of all beneficent animal life.

The primordial beast is killed in the creation myth, but from its marrow, organs and  the world is repopulated with animal life. The soul of the primordial bovine – geush urvan – returned to the world as the soul of livestock. Although geush urvan is an aspect of the primordial bovine in Zoroastrian tradition, and may also be that in the Younger Avesta, the relationship between the two is unclear in the oldest texts.

In scripture
Although Avestan gav- "cow" is grammatically feminine, the word is also used as a singular for the collective "cattle". In English language translations Gavaevodata is often referred to in gender-neutral terms as "primordial ox". Other translations refer to Gavaevodata as a bull and is similar to the Egyptian God Apis. The -aevo.data of the name literally means "created as one" or "solely created" or "uniquely created". 

Gavaevodata is only alluded to in the surviving texts of the Avesta, referred to by name in only two hymns. In other instances, for example in Yasht 13.85, the primordial beast is mentioned among the six material creations, but not by name. Elsewhere, such as in the Gathic Avestan Yasna Haptanghaiti, prayers are offered on behalf of the soul of the cow (geush urvan), or worship is offered to "the cow's soul, and to her created body", but in neither case is Gavaevodata mentioned by name, nor is it clear (unlike in Zoroastrian tradition) whether the soul of the cow is the soul of Gavaevodata.

This is also the case for The Cow's Lament. In this allegorical text, the soul of the cow (geush urvan) despairs over the wretched condition to which the forces of deceit (druj) have subjected her (see myth, below), and over her lack of protection from an adequate herdsman. The divinities hold council, and decide that Zoroaster is the only one who can alleviate her condition. At first she laments even more, holding Zoroaster to be incompetent, but finally accepts his assistance.

At least two levels of meaning have been inferred from this text: The maltreated creature symbolizes the plight of Zoroaster's community, and the soul of the primordial beast is a metaphor for the message that Zoroaster has received from Mazda.

In the 30 hymns to the divinities of the Zoroastrian calendar month, Gavaevodata is again invoked in the verses nominally dedicated to the Moon.

In tradition
The mythology of the "uniquely created bovine" that is only alluded to in the extant Avesta appears fully developed in the 9th–11th century Middle Persian texts of Zoroastrian tradition.

As also for all other Zoroastrian cosmological beliefs, the primary source of information on the primordial ox is the Bundahishn, a 9th century text. In this text, the primordial ox is a hermaphrodite, having both milk and semen. It is "white, bright like the moon, and three measured poles in height". The uniquely created ox lived its life on the river Veh. Daiti, and on the opposite bank lived Gayomart/d (Avestan Gayo maretan), the mythical first human.

 role in the creation myth runs as follows: During the first three-thousand year period, Ahura Mazda's (Ormuzd) fashioned the bovine as His fourth or fifth of six primordial material creations. At the beginning of the second three-thousand year period, Angra Mainyu (Ahriman) attacked the world, and the Creator responded by placing the primordial plant, bovine, and human in the respective heavenly spheres of the stars, moon, and sun. But Ahriman assaulted the sky and Ormuzd fed the bovine "medicinal mang" (mang bēšaz) to lessen its suffering. The bovine immediately became feeble, and then died.

But as it lay dying its chihr was rescued and carried to "the moon station". In the care of the moon, the chihr of the beast was purified and became the male and female pairs of the animals "of many species." After the bovine's death, fifty-five kinds of grain and twelve kinds of medicinal plants grew from its marrow. In another passage, the Bundahishn speaks of sesame, lentils, leeks, grapes, mustard, and marjoram issuing from various other parts of its body. For example, lentils from the liver, and mustard from the lungs.. 

Goshorun (from Avestan geush urvan), the soul of the primordial bovine, escaped to the star, moon, and sun stations where she lamented the destruction of the world. She was not placated until Ormuzd shows her the fravashi of the yet-unborn Zoroaster (whose  protection she would receive). Contented with the promise of protection, Goshorun then agreed to be "created back to the world as livestock."

See also
Gou Mata
Auðumbla, a primeval cow in Norse mythology
Sacred bull
Tauroctony
Dema Deity

Notes

References

Bibliography
.
.
.

Religious cosmologies
Zoroastrian philosophical concepts
Zoroastrian legendary creatures
Mythological bovines
Intersex in religion and mythology